Chiloxanthus is a genus of shore bugs in the family Saldidae. There are about nine described species in Chiloxanthus.

Species
These nine species belong to the genus Chiloxanthus:
 Chiloxanthus alticola Kiritshenko, 1931
 Chiloxanthus arcticus (Sahlberg, 1878)
 Chiloxanthus corporaali Lindberg, 1935
 Chiloxanthus kozlovi (Kiritshenko, 1912)
 Chiloxanthus lama (Kiritshenko, 1912)
 Chiloxanthus pilosus (Fallén, 1807)
 Chiloxanthus poloi (Kiritshenko, 1912)
 Chiloxanthus sangchana Drake, 1954
 Chiloxanthus stellatus (Curtis, 1835)

References

Further reading

 
 

Articles created by Qbugbot
Heteroptera genera
Chiloxanthinae